Hister coenosus is a species of clown beetle in the family Histeridae. It is found in the Caribbean Sea, Central America, and North America.

References

Further reading

 

Histeridae
Articles created by Qbugbot
Beetles described in 1834